James Gallacher (born 29 March 1951) is a Scottish former football goalkeeper. Gallacher played for Arbroath and Clydebank in the Scottish Football League. He made over 600 league appearances for the Bankies in a career that spanned four decades (late 1960s to early 1990s) and was fondly known as 'Easy the Gal' by the club's supporters. He followed his playing career at New Kilbowie Park by coaching the club's goalkeepers until 1997. Then followed a spell from 2001 until 2008 coaching with the Scotland Women's National team. That ended and until 2016 Jim was goalkeeper coach at Dumbarton

His son, Paul Gallacher, also became a professional football goalkeeper, playing for Dundee United, Norwich City and Scotland, while his nephew Tony Gallacher was previously on the books of Liverpool.

See also
 List of footballers in Scotland by number of league appearances (500+)

References

External links 

1951 births
Living people
Association football goalkeepers
Sportspeople from Clydebank
Footballers from West Dunbartonshire
Scottish footballers
Arbroath F.C. players
Clydebank F.C. (1965) players
Scottish Football League players
Association football coaches
Dumbarton F.C. non-playing staff
Clydebank F.C. (1965) non-playing staff